James Richert Rauch (born August 17, 1979) is an American former competition swimmer and Olympic medalist.  Rauch won a silver medal as a member of the second-place U.S. team in the men's 4×200-meter freestyle relay at the 2000 Summer Olympics in Sydney, Australia.

See also
 List of Olympic medalists in swimming (men)
 List of University of Texas at Austin people

References
 

1979 births
Living people
American male freestyle swimmers
Olympic silver medalists for the United States in swimming
Sportspeople from Houston
Swimmers at the 2000 Summer Olympics
Texas Longhorns men's swimmers
Medalists at the 2000 Summer Olympics
Swimmers from Texas